Dragons of Argonath (1998) is a fantasy novel written by Christopher Rowley. The book is the sixth in the Dragons of the Argonath series that follows the adventures of a human boy, Relkin, and his dragon, Bazil Broketail as they fight in the Argonath Legion’s 109th Marneri Dragons.

Back in the home of the Fighting 109th, the city of Marneri, a rebellion is brewing fomented by the grain merchants, but behind the merchants is Waakzaam the Great, an “elemental” wizard who has come to Ryetelth to add the world to the other twelve already under his control. Two plagues, spread by rats and agents of Waakzamm, are unleashed on the Argonath specifically designed to weaken the Empire’s Legions. When civil war does break out with the rebellious forces, it is the 109th Marneri Dragons at the forefront of the battle. Ultimately they are able to drive Waakzaam from the world of Ryetelth, but are unable to kill him.

1998 American novels
Novels by Christopher Rowley
American fantasy novels